The Stolpersteine in Prague-Malá Strana lists the Stolpersteine in the town quarter Malá Strana (Czech for "Little Side (of the River)") of Prague. Stolpersteine is the German name for stumbling blocks collocated all over Europe by German artist Gunter Demnig. They remember the fate of the Nazi victims being murdered, deported, exiled or driven to suicide.

Generally, the stumbling blocks are posed in front of the building where the victims had their last self chosen residence. The name of the Stolpersteine in Czech is: Kameny zmizelých.

Malá Strana

Dates of collocations 
The Stolpersteine of Prague-Malá Strana were posed by the artist himself on the following days:

 13 June 2011: Karel Jelinek
 28 October 2012: Artur Lasch
 17 July 2013: Přemysl Šámal

The Czech Stolperstein project was initiated in 2008 by the Česká unie židovské mládeže (Czech Union of Jewish Youth) and was realized with the patronage of the Mayor of Prague.

See also 
 List of cities by country that have stolpersteine
 Stolpersteine in the Czech Republic

External links

 stolpersteine.eu, Demnig's website
 holocaust.cz

References

Malá Strana